Korea's Next Top Model (abbreviated as KNTM; also known as Do-jeon! Supermodel Korea (도전! 수퍼모델 코리아) is a South Korean reality television show in which a number of women compete for the title of Korea's Next Top Model and a chance to start their career in the modelling industry. The prize also includes a feature in W Magazine Korea and a contract for SK-II.

As part of the Top Model franchise, it is based on the hit American TV show America's Next Top Model, and it shares the same format. On 6 January 2010 it was announced that Korean channel Onstyle would begin production of a Korean version of the model search show. Model Jang Yoon-ju would helm the judging panel as the host of the show.

Plans for a male-exclusive spin off began in 2014 before a 5th regular installment was aired, but the idea was put on hold. It was subsequently revealed that cycle 5 of the series would be a co-ed edition featuring male contestants.

Premise
The series features a group of young contestants, who live together in a house for several months while taking part in challenges, photo shoots and meetings with members of the modeling industry. Normally, one or more poor-performing contestants are eliminated each week until the last contestant remaining is crowned "Korea's Next Top Model" and receives a modeling contract for representation and other prizes.

Cycles
'

References

External links
 Official Website

 
OnStyle original programming
2010 South Korean television series debuts
South Korean television series based on American television series